List of A roads in the zone 7 in Great Britain starting north of the Solway Firth/Eden Estuary, west of the A7 and south of the A8 (roads beginning with 7). Data from Openstreetmap.

Single and double digit roads

Three and four digit numbers

See also
 B roads in Zone 7 of the Great Britain numbering scheme
 List of motorways in the United Kingdom
 Transport in Edinburgh#Road network
 Transport in Glasgow#Other Roads
 Transport in Scotland#Road

References 

7
7